Microsystem Technologies is a peer-reviewed scientific journal published by Springer Science+Business Media. It covers research on electromechanical, materials, design, and manufacturing aspects of microsystems and their components. The editors-in-chief of the journal are B. Michel (Fraunhofer IZM, Berlin, Germany) and B. Bhushan (Ohio State University).

Abstracting and indexing 
The journal is abstracted and indexed in:

According to the Journal Citation Reports, the journal has a 2016 impact factor of 1.195.

References

External links 
 

Engineering journals
Springer Science+Business Media academic journals
Monthly journals
Publications established in 1994
English-language journals